This is a list of all former coaches of Atlético Madrid.  Current coach Diego Simeone took over from Gregorio Manzano on the 23rd of December 2011.

Managers

See also

 Atlético Madrid
 List of Atlético Madrid players

References

External links
 Atlético de Madrid Official Website
 Atleticopedia international WIKI-Project about Atlético
 

Atletico Madrid
Managers